Hugo Norberto Castillo Franco (born March 17, 1971 in Misiones, Argentina), known as Hugo Castillo, is an Argentine football manager and former player.

Managerial statistics

Managerial statistics

External links
 
 

1971 births
Living people
Sportspeople from Misiones Province
Argentine footballers
Association football forwards
Liga MX players
C.F. Monterrey players
Argentine football managers
Atlas F.C. footballers
Club América footballers
Santos Laguna footballers
Atlas F.C. managers
Argentine expatriate footballers
Argentine expatriate sportspeople in Mexico
Expatriate footballers in Mexico